Stakeholder may refer to:
Stakeholder (corporate), a group, corporate, organization, member, or system that affects or can be affected by an organization's actions
Project stakeholder, a person, group, or organization with an interest in a project

See also 
 Stakeholder analysis, the process of identifying those affected by a project or event
Stakeholder engagement
Stakeholder engagement software
Stakeholder management
Stakeholder theory, a theory that identifies and models the groups that are stakeholders of a project or corporation 
Escrow